Puntigrus navjotsodhii is a species of cyprinid fish endemic to the upper Katingan and Barito basins in central Borneo.

References 

Puntigrus
Freshwater fish of Indonesia
Fish described in 2012